Unoakhaiasor Olowu, born Unoakhaiasor(c. 1855 - August 14, 1967) was an Oba and powerful trader in Imiekuri, Okpella, Nigeria. Also known as the 1st Oba of Imiekuri, he was recognized as powerful by those he traded with in Ghana and Nigerian states, having become rich through the cotton and slave trades. On August 14, 1967 he died of old age, at his home in Illewi.

Background 
Olowu was born in Imiekuri, Okpella, Nigeria around 1855 in a small village called Illewi. He was born into a aristocratic family of merchants. Growing up in the agrarian town, he was helpful in bringing development to Imiekuri in his form of trade, it has been said that he travelled long distances through west Africa on foot to carry this out . During his early life he encountered a ferocious lion who raided the village, as he was asleep the beast attempted to kill him, in which he defeated it with his own hands saving the community.

Personal life 
Olowu was a strong practitioner of Juju he was known to have supernatural abilities as he was strong in African traditional religion. He had 2 children from his wife, who died in 1916. Ikhumitse Olowu, his son, was the first one in the family and village to get an education. Olowu spoke numerous languages fluently: Okpella, Yoruba, Igbo, Hausa  , English, etc. 
During his life of trade his mother was captured by slave traders, taken away from their village he journeyed to save her before she was sold, in this event he successfully was able to rescue her, though for her to not speak Estako but Igbo.Around the early 1930s Olowu's mother died from old age.

Involvement with the slave trade 
Olowu was a powerful slave trader in Nigeria. In his early life, he traveled from Nigeria to Ghana for trading and brought back bamboo seeds to plant in the Okpella Region. He also traveled to villages and towns in the areas of the Midwest region including Badagry for his trade.  Many family members regarded him as influential in the cotton trade as well as that of other commodities like cocoa, palm oil, and tobacco. During his time as a trader he changed his surname and beared Olowu, due to his trade with the Yoruba. At the beginning of the 20th century Olowu abandoned the slave trade and took on his duties as Oba Of Imiekuri an Atsogwa.

Life as Oba Of Ilewi 
Sometime after the Nupe war in Okpella, Olowu became the first Oba of Imiekuri, he was known to bring development to Illewi and his people, and reigned until his death.

Later life and death 
Later in his life after being king he went back to farming. Around the mid-1960s Olowu was getting very old and began to shrink in height due to his age, and was being watched by family members and friends. One day in fall of 1967 oba wasn't eating and was kept in bed for days, and died on August 14, 1967 at the estimated age of 112 and was buried at his home in Ilewi. Today he is remembered as a legend in Imiekuri for development and background

1855 births
1967 deaths
19th-century Nigerian businesspeople